Usha S. Kakade is an Indian social activist and the founder and president of Gravittus Foundation (previously known as USK Foundation). The organization works for underprivileged children and women in Maharashtra state.

Early life and career

Usha Kakade is honored with Paul Harris Fellow recognition by Rotary International organization. In 2019, she was also felicitated with "Pride of the Nation" honor by Rajnath Singh. She is the wife of Indian politician and businessman Sanjay Kakade.

In 2019, Usha Kakade and "Gravittus Foundation" launched a book 'Gravittus Ratna' written by Megha Shimpi and Parag Potdar. Every year, Usha and her organization conduct 'URJA Awards' ceremony.

Usha is also the chairwoman of Gravittus Corporation.

Filmography
Usha Kakade produced 'Flight of Freedom (2018)' film.

Awards and honors
"Pride of the Nation" award 2019
Paul Harris Fellow recognition, 2018
Femina Women Awards 2017
 Lokmat Style Award 2017
 India Today Healthcare Award
 Best CSR Award 2018, Economic Times Maharashtra Achievers 
 Hall of Fame Award for her project 'Good touch bad touch'

References

External links
 

Living people
Year of birth missing (living people)
Indian film producers
Indian activists